Mokhovaya is a rural locality (a village) in Chaykovsky, Perm Krai, Russia. The population was 69 as of 2010. There are 3 streets.

Geography 
Mokhovaya is located 42 km northeast of Chaykovsky. Zasechny is the nearest rural locality.

References 

Rural localities in Chaykovsky urban okrug